Nőtincs, a pictorial locality looking back on a thousand-year old history is in Nógrád county, Hungary. Nőtincs is seated at the border of Cserhát and Börzsöny hills. Its location determines the function of the village.

Demographics 
1213 inhabitants. Of it is 96.3% Hungary; 0.6% Romani; 0.4% Germans; 0.4% Slovaks as well as 3.6% without closer data. In the village are 466 housing units.

Roman-catholic: 83.1% Eastern catholic: 0.5% Reformed: 2.8% Lutheraner: 3.6% Other faith associatednesses: 0.4% Denomination lot: 3.1% No indication: 6.4%.

History 

The village was first mentioned in 1317. Its name comes from nő (woman) and tincs (tuft).

It was first mentioned in records in 1317. Its Roman Catholic Church was built in 1415. The Gyurcsányi-Scitovszky mansion was built in 1809 in a 4 ha primeval park in the middle of the village. The statue of St. Florian on the facade of the old Catholic school was made around 1780.

Sights in neighbourhood 

 Bánk: Lake (beach, fishing place, water-stage), every summer nationality festival
 Rétság: St. Andrew Roman Catholic church, Kovács mansion
 Diósjenő: Lake (fishing place), open-air bath
 Felsőpetény: Church, Almássy-manson
 Nógrád: Spectacular ruins of castle Nógrád, which was the centre of Nógrád county between 11th and 13th centuries and gave the name to the county

External links 
  in Hungarian

Populated places in Nógrád County